Dimocarpus gardneri is a species of plant related to the longan found in Sri Lanka. It is endangered in the wild due to habitat loss.

References 

gardneri